Luka Azariashvili (born 30 November 1999 in Tbilisi, Georgia) is a rugby union player who currently plays for Montpellier in the Top 14  and Biarritz Olympique in the Rugby top 14 (loan) and also plays internationally for Georgia U20 as a Tighthead prop.

References

External links
  Luka Azariashvili, Montpellier Rugby
 Luka Azariashvili, It's rugby

1999 births
Living people
Expatriate rugby union players from Georgia (country)
Expatriate rugby union players in France
Rugby union players from Georgia (country)
Expatriate sportspeople from Georgia (country) in France
Montpellier Hérault Rugby players
Rugby union props
Rugby union players from Tbilisi